Fraser Lake Airport  is located  southeast of Fraser Lake, British Columbia, Canada.

See also
Fraser Lake Water Aerodrome

References

External links
Archived March 2016 Page about this airport from COPA's Places to Fly Current Map View airport directory

Registered aerodromes in British Columbia
Regional District of Bulkley-Nechako